Histria Ivory  is a Chemical/Oil Products Tanker owned by the Romanian shipping company Histria Shipmanagement and is registered in Valletta, Malta.

History
Histria Ivory was built by the Constanța Shipyard in 2006 as a  ship used for the transportation of oil and oil products and chemical products. 
The ship is chartered by the Italian oil and natural gas company Eni.

Technical description
The Histria Ivory is equipped with a double hull, one two-stroke acting diesel engine MAN B&W 6S50MC-C with a capacity of  directly acting on the propeller shaft and a four-bladed fixed propeller built by Wärtsilä Propulsion Netherlands. It also has another three auxiliary MAN B&W 6L23/30H diesel engines with a capacity of  each. The ship has 14 hydraulically driven centrifugal deepwell Framo cargo pumps, 10 pumps with a capacity of 500 m3/hour, two pumps with a capacity of 200 m3/hour, one pump with a capacity of 100 m3/hour and one portable pump with a capacity of 150 m3/hour.

The ship has ten cargo tanks, two tanks with a capacity of 3,550 m3, four tanks with a capacity of 4,900 m3, four tanks with a capacity of 5,100 m3 and two slop tanks with a capacity of 1,000 m3.

References

Ships built in Romania
2006 ships
Merchant ships of Romania